SOES may stand for: 
 Scarborough Outdoor Education School
 School of Ocean & Earth Science (University of Southampton)
 The South of England Show, a county show in the United Kingdom
 Small Order Execution System, NASDAQ automatic trading of small quantities of stocks